Nathaniel "Nate" Singleton III (born July 5, 1968) is a former professional American football wide receiver in the National Football League. He played five seasons for the San Francisco 49ers (1993–1996) and the Baltimore Ravens (1997).

1968 births
Living people
Players of American football from New Orleans
American football wide receivers
Grambling State Tigers football players
San Francisco 49ers players
Baltimore Ravens players